CJ ENM (CJ Entertainment aNd Merchandising) is a South Korean entertainment and retail company founded in 2018.

CJ ENM was established as a result of the merger of two CJ Group subsidiaries, CJ E&M and CJ O Shopping respectively, in July 2018.

In 2020, the company established a first look deal with Warner Horizon.

In early December 2021, CJ ENM has partnered with ViacomCBS (now Paramount) for bringing Paramount+ into TVING along with co-production in future projects.

In January 2022, CJ ENM bought the majority stake of Endeavor Content and changed the name in September 2022 to Fifth Season.

Divisions
 CJ ENM Entertainment Division – operates as an entertainment and media company. They produce groups from survival shows like IZ*ONE (K-pop), that disbanded in 2021, and JO1 (J-pop).
 CJ ENM Commerce Division – operates as a home shopping company.

Locations
 CJ ENM Entertainment Division: 66, Sangamsan-Ro, Mapo-Gu, Seoul, Korea
 CJ ENM Commerce Division: 870–13, 870–13, Gwacheon-daero, Seocho-gu, Seoul, Korea

Notes

References

External links
 
 

Mass media companies established in 2018
Companies listed on KOSDAQ
Companies based in Seoul
Entertainment companies of South Korea
Mass media companies of South Korea
Retail companies of South Korea
CJ Group subsidiaries
South Korean companies established in 2018